Al-Ḥasan ibn ʻAlī al-Barbahārī (867-941 CE) was a Muslim theologian and populist religious leader from Iraq. He was a scholar and jurist who is famous for his role in suppressing S̲h̲īʿa missionaries and Mu'tazilism in the Abbasid Caliphate during his lifetime. His books include creedal and methodological refutations against certain sects including the Shias, Qadaris, and the Mu'tazilites.

Biography
Al-Barbahari was born in Baghdad, Iraq, and was taught by the students of Ahmad ibn Hanbal.  Al-Barbahari then took Ibn Hanbal's views and championed them. He was also known to be an associate of the Sufi Sahl al-Tustari.

Al-Barbahari had several students, including the famed scholar Ibn Battah. His status as an authority within the Hanbali school was not universal, however, and al-Barbahari and his students were often in conflict with Abu Bakr al-Khallal, generally considered to be the sole preserver and codifier of the school. While al-Barbahari contributed little to jurisprudence, he was well known as a polemicist.

Defender Of The Sunnah
Al-Barbahari was the leader of a number of protests against other sects during the Abbasid Caliphate in Baghdad. His followers were concentrated  in the Hanbalite quarter of the city. He was very influential among the urban lower classes, and exploited popular grievances to foment what often turned into mob violence against religious minorities and supposed sinners.

From 921 CE until his death in 941 CE, al-Barbahari fought for literalist Sunni thought and practice, leading masses of Sunnis in actions to stop the sale of wine and visits to the "tombs of certain religious figures".  They destroyed musical instruments and fought against Shiism and Mu'tazilism. 

Under the influence of al-Barbahari and the popular pressure of his followers, the Caliphs Al-Muqtadir and Al-Qahir enforced Sunni "orthodoxy" (according to the Athari creed) as the state creed, exiling and imprisoning al-Barbahari's enemies and even burying renowned Muslim historian Muhammad ibn Jarir al-Tabari, considered a heretic by most Atharis at the time, in secret due to fears of mob violence were a funeral to be held at the public graveyard. Al-Barbahari had ordered groups to check any homes suspected of containing wine or musical instruments. The crowds confiscated from shops and physically enforced female entertainers to leave their practices. 

The efforts of al-Barbahari and the Baghdad Atharis were brought to an end in 935 CE by the new Caliph Ar-Radi. Ar-Radi ended the favoured status of the Atharis.

Thought
Like other Hanbali, Barbahari strongly opposed bidʻah (religious innovation), defined as anything regarding worship that the first generation of Muslims (known as the Companions of the Prophet or Sahabah) "did not do". Thus he taught that "whoever asserts that there is any part of Islam with which the Companions of the Prophet did not provide us, is calling them [the Companions of the Prophet] liars". While not opposed to reason in religion, provided it was put to good use and did not contradict doctrine such as divine attributes, he nonetheless, opposed asking "'why?' and 'how?'  Theology, polemic, disputation, and argument are an innovation which casts doubt into the heart".

See also 
 Islamic scholars
 Notable Hanbali Scholars

References 

941 deaths
Year of birth unknown
Hanbalis
Sunni Muslim scholars of Islam
People from Baghdad
Hadith scholars
Iraqi Sunni Muslims
10th-century people from the Abbasid Caliphate
10th-century Arabs
10th-century jurists